Liam Bradley Gill (born 8 June 1992) is a professional rugby union player for Lyon. He was born in Melbourne and lived in the United States before playing junior Rugby in Adelaide for the Old Collegians. His regular playing position is Flanker.

Gill attended Gregory Terrace, a private school in Brisbane. He was not only captain of the First XV in 2009 but also school vice-captain.

In 2010, he became the youngest ever to player to compete in the IRB Junior World Championship during which his Australian side lost to New Zealand in the final. He was a member of the Australia U20s team that competed in the 2011 IRB Junior World Championship, along with fellow Queenslanders: Joel Faulkner, Tevita Kuridrani, Matt Lucas, Simon Morahan, Eddie Quirk, Siliva Siliva, Dom Shipperley, and  Kimami Sitauti. He was named captain of the Australia U20s side that competed in the 2012 IRB Junior World Championship.

In 2012, Gill made his debut for the Australian Rugby Team, the 'Wallabies'. As well as being that year's Australian Under-20 captain, Gill became the 861st player to have represented Australia.

References

External links
Reds profile
IRB profile

1992 births
Living people
Australia international rugby union players
Australian expatriate rugby union players
Australian expatriate sportspeople in France
Australian rugby union players
Brisbane City (rugby union) players
Commonwealth Games bronze medallists for Australia
Commonwealth Games medallists in rugby sevens
Commonwealth Games rugby sevens players of Australia
Commonwealth Games silver medallists for Australia
Expatriate rugby union players in France
Lyon OU players
Male rugby sevens players
Queensland Reds players
RC Toulonnais players
Rugby sevens players at the 2010 Commonwealth Games
Rugby sevens players at the 2014 Commonwealth Games
Rugby union flankers
Rugby union players from Melbourne
Urayasu D-Rocks players
Australia international rugby sevens players
Medallists at the 2010 Commonwealth Games